The discography of Rich Mullins includes 11 studio albums, 6 compilations, 20 singles and 1 musical.

Albums

With Zion
Behold the Man (1981)

Solo
Rich Mullins (1986)
Pictures in the Sky (1987)
Winds of Heaven, Stuff of Earth (1988) 
Never Picture Perfect (1989) 
The World as Best as I Remember It, Volume One (1991)  
The World as Best as I Remember It, Volume Two (1992)

With A Ragamuffin Band
A Liturgy, a Legacy, & a Ragamuffin Band (1993)
Brother's Keeper (1995)
The Jesus Record (1998)

Compilations
Songs (1996)
Songs 2 (1999)
Simply (2005)
The Best of Rich Mullins: Platinum Series (2006)
Triple Feature: Rich Mullins/The World as Best as I Remember It, Vols. 1& 2 (2010)

Live Albums 
 Here in America CD with DVD (2003)
 Deep Valley (2023)

Tribute Albums 
Awesome God: A Tribute to Rich Mullins (1998)
Music Inspired by the Motion Picture Ragamuffin (Based on the Life of Rich Mullins) (2014)
Bellsburg... The Songs of Rich Mullins (2022)
Worktapes… More Songs of Rich Mullins (2023)

Other 
Canticle of the Plains (1997)

Singles

References

External links
 Rich Mullins' Official Website, includes albums and lyrics
 Rich Mulllins Artist's Profile, includes discography 

Discographies of American artists
Pop music discographies
Christian music discographies